Ormonde Butler "Ormie" Haycock (September 11, 1880 – August 12, 1938) was a Canadian figure skater and rower from Ottawa, Ontario, and he competed in both single skating and pair skating.

Biography
Haycock's pairs partners in figure skating were his younger sisters Katherine and Aimee Haycock, as well as Lady Evelyn Grey. As a single skater, he is the 1905, 1906, 1908 and 1911 Canadian champion. He won the pairs skating Canadian championships in 1905 and 1906 with Katherine Haycock, in 1908 with Aimee Haycock, and in 1910 and 1911 with Lady Evelyn Grey.

Haycock was also a prominent rower with the Ottawa Rowing Club and in 1906 he won the American four-oared championship along with Harvey Pulford, Eddie Phillips and Wilf Poapst. 

Haycock died at his summer home in Canandaigua, New York in 1938, at an age of 57.

Figure skating results
men's singles

pairs

References

Notes

1880 births
1938 deaths
Canadian male pair skaters
Canadian male single skaters
Canadian male rowers
Rowers from Ottawa
19th-century Canadian people
20th-century Canadian people